() is a French genre of opera or opéra-ballet where the plot is based on fairy tales, often with elements of magic in their stories. Popular in the 18th century, from the time of Jean-Philippe Rameau onwards, the form reached its culmination with works such as La belle au bois dormant by Michele Carafa and Cendrillon by Nicolas Isouard at the beginning of the 19th century.

Examples of the genre include:
Zémire et Azor (1771), music by André Grétry
Cendrillon (1810) and Aladin ou la Lampe merveilleuse (1822), music by Nicolas Isouard, libretti by Charles-Guillaume Étienne
Zirphile et fleur de myrte ou cent ans en un jour (1818), music by Charles-Simon Catel, libretto by Victor-Joseph Étienne de Jouy and Nicolas Lefebvre
Le cheval de bronze (1835), music by Daniel Auber
La fée aux roses (1849), libretto by Jules-Henri Vernoy de Saint-Georges and Eugène Scribe, music by Fromental Halévy, Paris, Théâtre de l'Opéra-Comique
La chatte blanche (1852) by the Frères Cogniard
Les amours du diable (1853), by Jules-Henri Vernoy de Saint-Georges, music by Albert Grisar, Paris, Théâtre Lyrique
Le roi Carotte (1872) and Le voyage dans la lune (1875), music by Jacques Offenbach (the first in collaboration with Victorien Sardou)
L'eau qui danse, le pomme qui chante et l'oiseau qui dit la vérité (2009), by Canadian composer Gilles Tremblay and Pierre Morency

See also
 Fairy-tale opera
 Féerie

References

Opera genres